Béla Illés (Born: Béla Lipner from Kassa, Austria-Hungary; now Košice, Slovakia), March 22, 1895 – Budapest, January 5, 1974) was a Hungarian left-wing writer and journalist who spent much of his life in exile in the Soviet Union.

In the now communist Hungary, he was not particularly appreciated by the Minister of Culture, József Révai, nor by György Lukács. However, he was used as a writer of the mass articles glorifying the communist system and the Soviet Union. He himself took the model role for literary Socialist Realism. In 1948, he (found) the story of the Belorussian cavalry captain Alexei Gusev, who had opposed the tsarist intervention in the suppression of the 1848 revolution in Hungary in 1848, and had been executed for it. This story was now to put the Soviet-Hungarian relationship on a new footing at the Centennial commemoration, which was celebrated in Hungary on a grand scale. His writing was printed en masse, and streets were named after Goosev.

Publications

References

External links 

 

1974 deaths
1895 births
Writers from Košice
Hungarian journalists
20th-century journalists
Hungarian expatriates in the Soviet Union